Betws yn Rhos is a village and community in Conwy County Borough, Wales.

Until 1974 it formed part of Denbighshire, but subsequent local government reorganisations saw it administered as part of Clwyd from 1974 to 1996, before its current administration as part of Conwy County Borough.
At the 2001 census the population was 944, increasing to 1,052 at the 2011 census.

The village itself only has a population of 312. The community includes the small settlements of Llanelian-yn-Rhos, Trofarth, Dolwen , Bryn-y-maen, and Dawn.

Etymology 
The first part of the name of the village comes from the Middle English word bedhus, meaning "prayer house", which became betws in Welsh. Bettws Newydd translates therefore to the new prayer house.

Sport
Betws yn Rhos is home to a football team who play in the Clwyd Football League.
Betws yn Rhos enjoyed a good first season 2007/08 but have since been unable to recapture their form in the 2008/09  In the summer of 2011 Craig Hughes took over Betws yn Rhos FC, to become their 4th manager in the last 5 seasons.  In 2011/12 the boundaries also changed and Betws yn Rhos now play in the newly formed Clwyd/Conwy Division.

Notable residents
T. Gwynn Jones (1871–1949), poet, scholar and journalist, who was born at Y Gwyndy Uchaf
Bruce Jones (born 1953), former Coronation Street actor who played Les Battersby

Governance
An electoral ward in the same name exists. This ward stretches to Llanfair Talhaiarn and has a total population of 2,122.

References

External links

 A Vision of Britain Through Time
 British Listed Buildings
 Clwyd Churches: Betws yn Rhos
 Clwyd Churches: Bryn-y-maen
 Clwyd Churches: Llaneilian-yn-Rhos
 Eastern Conwy Churches Survey: Betws yn Rhos
 Eastern Conwy Churches Survey: Llanelian-yn-Rhos
 Genuki
 Geograph
 Office for National Statistics